This is a chronological list of officially released songs by Brazilian folk singer, songwriter and musician Mallu Magalhães.

Released songs

2008
 "Angelina"
 "Anyone Else But You"
 "Don't You Leave Me"
 "Don't You Look Back"
 "Dry Freezing Tongue"
 "Faz"
 "Get To Denmark"
 "Girassóis"
 "Happy Song"
 "Have You Ever"
 "Her Day Will Come"
 "Hora Marcada"
 "I Do Believe"
 "I Really Know Boys"
 "Il Va Partir"
 "It Ain't Me Babe"
 "It Takes Two To Tango"
 "J1"
 "Letrinhas dos Jornais"
 "Meia Colorida"
 "Mr. Blue Eyes"
 "My Honey"
 "Noil"
 "O Preço da Flor"
 "Once Upon a Time There Was a Flying Cat"
 "Pata de Leão"
 "Song To George"
 "Sualk"
 "Tchubaruba"
 "Town of Rock'n'Roll"
 "Vanguart"
 "Versinho de Número Três"
 "Xylophones"
 "You Know You've Got"

2009
 "A Risk To Take"
 "Aí-Há"
 "Bee on the Grass"
 "Compromisso"
 "Daniel e Cecília"
 "É Você Que Tem"
 "Make It Easy"
 "My Home Is My Man"
 "Nem Fé Nem Santo"
 "O Herói, O Marginal"
 "Ricardo"
 "Shine Yellow"
 "Soul Mate"
 "Te Acho Tão Bonito"
 "Versinho de Número Três"
 "Versinho de Número Um"
 "You Ain't Gonna Loose"

Source:

Unofficially released songs
This is a chronological list of unofficially released songs by Folk singer Mallu Magalhães.

2008–2010
 "A Vida Sempre Ensina"
 "Bossa Sem Nome"
 "Bossa Sem Nome (Version 2)"
 "Hound Dog"
 "Moreno do Cabelo Enroladinho"
 "Música Urbana"
 "Sambinha Bom"
 "Sambinha Sem Refrão"
 "Versinho de Número Cinco"

Source:

Miscellaneous songs

Collaborations
2009 on Marcelo Camelo's Sou
 "Janta"

Source:

Cover versions

Recorded material
This is a chronological list of cover versions that have been commercially released by Mallu Magalhães:

2009 – "How D'You Do" – (originally by Paul McCartney) recorded for the album "Beatles 69 Vol.2 – O Outro Lado Da Abbey Road".
2009 – "It Ain't Me Babe" – (originally by Bob Dylan) recorded for the album "Letra & Música: Bob Dylan".

Source:

Live songs
This list includes cover versions performed live by Mallu Magalhães. Only vocal performances and musical elements with substantial use have been included:

2008 on 2008 tour:
 "Folsom Prison Blues" – by Johnny Cash
2010 on 2010 tour:
 "Pode Vir Quente Que Estou Fervendo" – by Erasmo Carlos

See also
 Mallu Magalhães discography

References

External links
 – official online website.

Magalhaes, Mallu